Heljo Pikhof (born 20 October 1958) is an Estonian politician. She has a been member of the XI, XII, XIII and XIV Riigikogu.

She was born in Tartu. In 1977 she graduated from Tartu Secondary School No. 2 (nowadays Miina Härma Gymnasium). In 1985 she graduated from Tartu University in law.

Since 1996 (intermittently) she has been a member of Tartu City Council.

Since 1996 she is a member of Moderates/People's Party Moderates/Social Democratic Party.

References

Living people
1958 births
Social Democratic Party (Estonia) politicians
Women members of the Riigikogu
Members of the Riigikogu, 2007–2011
Members of the Riigikogu, 2011–2015
Members of the Riigikogu, 2015–2019
Members of the Riigikogu, 2019–2023
Members of the Riigikogu, 2023–2027
Miina Härma Gymnasium alumni
University of Tartu alumni
Politicians from Tartu
21st-century Estonian women politicians